Belqees TV (Arabic:قناة بلقيس) is a Yemeni news channel owned by Tawakkol Karman. It was named Belqees after the Queen of Sheba. It was started with the help of Doha Centre for Media Freedom. It started broadcasting in the Yemeni capital Sanaa in 2014, but moved to Istanbul after being attacked by the Houthis.

References

External links 
 
 Youtube Channel

Television in Yemen
Television stations in Yemen
Television channels and stations established in 2014